Eva Gabor (February 11, 1919 – July 4, 1995) was a Hungarian-American actress, businesswoman, singer, and socialite. She voiced Duchess and Miss Bianca in the animated Disney Classics, The Aristocats (1970), The Rescuers (1977), and The Rescuers Down Under (1990). She was popular in her role on the 1965–71 television sitcom Green Acres as Lisa Douglas, the wife of Eddie Albert's character Oliver Wendell Douglas. Gabor was successful as an actress in film, on Broadway, and on television. She was also a successful businesswoman, marketing wigs, clothing, and beauty products. Her elder sisters, Zsa Zsa and Magda Gabor, were also actresses and socialites.

Early life and career
Gabor was born in Budapest, Hungary, the youngest of three daughters of Vilmos Gábor, a soldier, and his wife, trained jeweler  Jolie (born Janka Tilleman). Her parents were both from Hungarian Jewish families. She was the first of the sisters to immigrate to the U.S., shortly after her first marriage to a Swedish osteopath, Dr. Eric Drimmer, whom she married in 1937 when she was 18 years old.
Her first movie role was in the U.S. in 1941's Forced Landing at Paramount Pictures. During the 1950s, she appeared in several feature films, including The Last Time I Saw Paris, starring Elizabeth Taylor; and Artists and Models, which featured Dean Martin and Jerry Lewis. These roles were bit parts. In 1953, she was given her own television talk show, The Eva Gabor Show, which ran for one season (1953–54). Through the rest of the 1950s and early 1960s she appeared on television and in movies. She appeared in one episode of the mystery series Justice and was on the game show What's My Line? as the "mystery challenger." Her film appearances during this era included a remake of My Man Godfrey, Gigi, and It Started with a Kiss.

Green Acres

In 1965, Gabor got the role of Lisa Douglas, whose attorney husband Oliver Wendell Douglas (Eddie Albert) decides to leave the "rat race" of city life. He buys a farm in a rural community, forcing Lisa to leave her beloved big-city urban life. The Paul Henning sitcom Green Acres aired on CBS. Green Acres was set in Hooterville, the same backdrop for Petticoat Junction (1963–70), and would occasionally cross over with its sister sitcom. Despite proving to be a ratings hit, staying in the top 20 for its first four seasons, Green Acres, along with another sister show, The Beverly Hillbillies, was cancelled in 1971 in the CBS network's "rural purge" — a policy to get rid of the network's rural-based television shows.

Later years

Gabor later did voice-over work for Disney movies, providing the European-accented voices of Duchess in The Aristocats, and Miss Bianca in The Rescuers and The Rescuers Down Under, as well as the Queen of Time in the Sanrio film Nutcracker Fantasy. She was a panelist on the Gene Rayburn-hosted Match Game. From 1983 to 1984, she was on the Match Game Hollywood Squares Hour starring Gene Rayburn and Jon Bauman.

Eva appeared as Aunt Renee in the fourth season of “Hart to Hart”, and in 1983, she reunited with Eddie Albert on Broadway as the Grand Duchess Olga Katrina in You Can't Take It with You. In 1990, she attempted a TV series comeback in the CBS sitcom pilot Close Encounters; the pilot aired as a special that summer, but did not make it to series status. She toured post-communist Hungary after a 40-year absence on an episode of Lifestyles of the Rich and Famous.

Business career
In 1972, she launched her eponymous fashion collection with Luis Estevez, a Cuban-born American fashion designer.

Marriages and relationships
Eva Gabor was married five times.  She had no children:
 Eric Valdemar Drimmer, a Swedish-born masseur turned osteopath and psychologist. They wed in London on June 3, 1937, and divorced in Los Angeles, California, on February 25, 1942 (the divorce was finalized on March 6); Gabor claimed cruelty, saying, "I wanted to have babies and lead a simple family life but my husband objected to my having children".
 Charles Isaacs, an American investment broker. They married on September 27, 1943, and were divorced on April 2, 1949.
 John Elbert Williams, MD, a plastic surgeon. They married on April 8, 1956, and were divorced on March 20, 1957.
 Richard Brown, a textile manufacturer, who later became a writer and director. They married at the Flamingo Hotel in Las Vegas, Nevada, on October 4, 1959, and divorced in Santa Monica, California, in June 1973.
 Frank Gard Jameson Sr., an aerospace executive and former vice president of Rockwell International. They married in the Vivian Webb Chapel of The Webb Schools, Claremont, California on September 21, 1973. The couple divorced in 1983. Gabor became a stepmother to Jameson's four children.

Gabor also had a long term on-and off affair with actor Glenn Ford which began during the filming of Don't Go Near the Water in 1957. They dated between their marriages and almost married in the early 1970s.

After her final marriage, Gabor was involved in a relationship with TV producer Merv Griffin until her death. It was rumored that this was a platonic relationship to hide Griffin's suspected homosexuality.

Death
Gabor died in Los Angeles on Independence Day 1995, from respiratory failure and pneumonia, following a fall in a bathtub in Mexico, where she had been on vacation. Her funeral was held on July 11, 1995, at Good Shepherd Catholic Church in Beverly Hills.

The youngest sister, Eva predeceased her elder sisters and her mother. Eldest sister Magda and mother Jolie Gabor both died two years later, in 1997. Elder sister Zsa Zsa died from cardiac arrest on December 18, 2016.

Interment

Gabor is interred in the Westwood Village Memorial Park Cemetery and is buried just yards from both her niece, Francesca Hilton, and her friend and former co-star Eddie Albert.

Theatre roles

Filmography

Film

Television

See also

 Gabor sisters
 Eva Gabor portrait by Americo Makk

References

Sources
 Orchids & Salami, by Eva Gabor, Doubleday, 1954 
 Gaborabilia, by Anthony Turtu and Donald F. Reuter, Three Rivers Press, 2001;

External links

 
 
 
 
 "Eva Gabor and New York stockbroker, Richard Brown wed", tcm.turner.com

1919 births
1995 deaths
20th-century American actresses
20th-century American businesspeople
20th-century American businesswomen
20th-century Hungarian actresses
Actresses from Budapest
American cosmetics businesspeople
American fashion businesspeople
American film actresses
American marketing businesspeople
American people of Hungarian-Jewish descent
American socialites
American stage actresses
American television actresses
American voice actresses
Burials at Westwood Village Memorial Park Cemetery
Businesspeople from Los Angeles
California Republicans
Deaths from pneumonia in California
Deaths from respiratory failure
Eva
Hungarian emigrants to the United States
Hungarian Jews
Hungarian socialites
Jewish American actresses
Marketing women
Naturalized citizens of the United States
20th-century American Jews